Angaria vicdani is a species of sea snail, a marine gastropod mollusc of the family Angariidae.

Description

The shell can grow up to 45 mm to 85 mm in length.

Distribution
Angaria vicdani can be found off of the South Philippines.

References

External links 
 Rosenberg, G. 1992. Encyclopedia of Seashells. Dorset: New York. 224 pp., at page 40.
 Poppe G.T. & Goto Y. (1993) Recent Angariidae. Ancona: Informatore Piceno. 32 pls, 10 pls.

Angariidae
Gastropods described in 1980